Eugene Victor Hoglan II (born August 31, 1967) is an American drummer, acclaimed for his creativity in drum arrangements, including use of abstract devices for percussion effects and his trademark lengthy double-kick drum rhythms. Though his playing style is very technically demanding, he retains high accuracy at extreme tempos, earning him the nicknames "The Atomic Clock" and "Human Drum Machine".

He is best known for his work with Dark Angel, Death, Strapping Young Lad, Devin Townsend, Fear Factory, Dethklok and Testament. Hoglan completed work on Dethklok's fourth album The Doomstar Requiem, which was released in October 2013. He released the highly successful Gene Hoglan: The Atomic Clock DVD, and rejoined Testament to record the drum tracks for their eleventh album, Dark Roots of Earth, released in July 2012. Hoglan had since rejoined Testament permanently, and by the time he left the band again in January 2022, he was their longest serving drummer.

Hoglan was featured on the cover of Modern Drummer magazine in November 2010. He also won Terrorizer magazine's Reader's Poll for Best Drummer 2010, and Modern Drummer magazine nominated Hoglan for Best Metal Drummer, and Best Recorded Performance (for Dethklok's Dethalbum II) on their 2011 ballot. He was nominated for Best Drummer in Revolver magazine's 2010 Reader's Poll.

Biography

Hoglan got his first drum kit when he was 13 and is completely self-taught. He started jamming along to his Kiss and Rush records, with Peter Criss and Neil Peart being his early influences.
Later Cozy Powell, Tommy Aldridge, Robb Reiner of Anvil, Rob "Wacko" Hunter of Raven and Phil "Philthy Animal" Taylor got him into double bass drumming. 

In 1983, Hoglan began his music career as a roadie (lighting engineer) for the thrash metal band Slayer, where he also played the drums during concert soundchecks. He also did backing vocals on the song "Evil Has No Boundaries", from the first Slayer album Show No Mercy.  He contributed in the recording of Haunting the Chapel, holding Dave Lombardo's drum kit together while recording "Chemical Warfare" because there was no carpet in the studio, said drum kit including a china cymbal owned by Hoglan. He became an influence in Lombardo's drumming style and speed. Lombardo had just had the double bass added to his kit and it was the first double bass Hoglan ever played. Lombardo was impressed with Hoglan's playing, and Hoglan gave Lombardo tips regarding the use of the double kick drum.

In 1984, Hoglan was part of the band War God with Michelle Meldrum. At the end of the same year he was asked to join the thrash metal band Dark Angel as the drummer. He penned most of the lyrics for Dark Angel's next three albums. He achieved greater fame during the mid-1990s playing with Death, at the same time that bandleader Chuck Schuldiner was taking that group into a more progressive style. Subsequently, he recorded one album with the thrash metal band Testament, and made the acquaintance of Canadian multi-instrumentalist Devin Townsend, forging a lasting friendship. Around this time, coming off of the final tour he performed with Death, Hoglan was approached by Slayer to replace a departing Paul Bostaph. Jon Dette, however, took the position, much to Hoglan's approval. He would go on to record several albums with Townsend, both as part of the speed/industrial/death metal band Strapping Young Lad and under Devin Townsend's name.

Hoglan was also part of thrash metal band Tenet, a side project of Strapping Young Lad guitarist Jed Simon, from 2003 to 2007. Hoglan left the band on amicable terms in January 2007. He was replaced by Adrian Erlandsson only to return to the group in June of the same year. Hoglan recorded his drum parts for the entirety of the following album in a mere two days.

On the Vancouver stop of Opeth's 2004 Lamentations tour, Hoglan stood in for drummer Martin Lopez, who was said to be having panic attacks. Opeth's drum tech had filled in for the two previous dates on the tour and Lopez rejoined the band for the Seattle, Washington, show.

In 2005, Hoglan stood in for Lopez for the majority of the Sounds of the Underground tour when Lopez began having more panic attacks. Hoglan played double duty by playing a set with Strapping Young Lad then performing with Opeth later in the evening. It was later announced Lopez had a rare blood disorder and was seeking treatment. Hoglan also appeared in Opeth's music video "The Grand Conjuration" as they filmed it on the tour while in Los Angeles, California.

Other bands have also recruited Hoglan as a session drummer. He has recorded albums with the Norwegian black metal band Old Man's Child and the Danish death metal band Daemon. Additionally he has done production and engineering work for other albums and demos. Hoglan also was recruited by Vancouver thrash metal band The Almighty Punchdrunk, and appeared as a band member for their only album to date, Music for Them Asses, released in 2001.

Hoglan is working with Dethklok, the band from the animated TV show Metalocalypse. The show was co-created by stand-up comedian/actor/musician Brendon Small, who also composes or performs all of the music. Hoglan features in Dethklok's debut album, The Dethalbum, which was released on September 25, 2007. He toured with Brendon Small and the live band during the summer of 2008. Besides working with Dethklok, Hoglan is also a guest star by voicing a health inspector in one episode of the series. He later performed on Dethalbum II, the sequel album released on September 29, 2009, and again toured with Dethklok. The two later collaborated to make Brendon Small's Galaktikon using extra studio time from the Dethklok studio sessions.

Hoglan filled in as the drummer for Unearth when their then drummer, Mike Justian, quit while on tour. He has also joined the metal band Pitch Black Forecast, with Mushroomhead singer Jason Popson, as the band's permanent drummer. Even more recently, Hoglan was announced as the drummer for the reunited Bay Area Thrash metal band Forbidden's reunion tour, replacing original drummer Paul Bostaph.

Hoglan played drums on Zimmers Hole's third studio album When You Were Shouting at the Devil...We Were in League With Satan in 2008.

In June 2011, he reunited with Testament, to record their eleventh studio album Dark Roots of Earth. On that album, he filled in for Paul Bostaph, who was unable to participate in the recording sessions because of a "serious injury". In 2012, he began touring with Testament, and on January 27 filled in for Charlie Benante of Anthrax. Although Hoglan was initially brought back to the band as a temporary drummer (in a fashion similar to his initial tenure when he recorded the Demonic album), he had since rejoined as a permanent member of Testament, recording two more albums with the band – Brotherhood of the Snake (2016) and Titans of Creation (2020) – and surpassing original drummer Louie Clemente as their longest-serving drummer. In 2018, Hoglan played with both Anthrax and Testament on the same nights during the Slayer farewell tour while Charlie Benante was recovering from carpal tunnel syndrome. Hoglan announced his second departure from Testament on January 21, 2022.

Gene was the drummer for Fear Factory from 2009 to 2012 and played on their release Mechanize; his association with the band ended when he was "no longer needed", and he expressed both a reluctance to join and a disappointment in the ultimate resolution of his tenure. He also participated in the recording sessions of Viking's reunion album, No Child Left Behind (2015).

In October 2013, it was announced that Hoglan would be participating in the reunion of Dark Angel, who still play live occasionally to this day. The band is also planning to release a new album in the future.

Other ventures
In 2017, Hoglan released an art collection consisting of long-exposure photography of him playing with colorful glowing drumsticks, resulting in psychedelic imagery.

Hoglan made a guest appearance in the season 2 finale of The Eric Andre Show on Adult Swim.

Equipment
Gene endorses and uses Pearl Drums, Sabian cymbals, Pro-Mark sticks and Evans heads.

Drum setup
Drums – Pearl Reference Carbon Mist Finish, Black Hardware
24x16 Bass Drum (x2)
12x10 Tom
14x12 Tom
18x16 Floor Tom
14x8 Brass Free Floating Snare Drum
Cymbals – Sabian
15" AAX X-Celerator Hi-Hats (or 15" AA Metal-X Hi Hats)
19" Paragon Chinese
22" HH Power Bell Ride 
18" AAX X-Plosion Fast Crash
18" AAX Metal Crash
8" Paragon Splash (originally owned by Neil Peart)
10" Paragon Splash (originally owned by Neil Peart)
19" AAX Metal Crash
22" HH Power Bell Ride (x2)
19" Paragon Chinese (or 20" AAX Chinese Brilliant) (x2)
Drumheads – Evans
G2 Clear
SD Dry
Pedals:
 Tama Camco (until 2015–2016) (×2)
 Pearl Eliminator Redline (nowadays) (×2)
Hardware – Pearl
B1000 Boom Stand (x7)
H2000 Hi-Hat Stand
S2000 Snare Stand
T2000 Double Tom Stand
D2000 Throne
Other
Pro-Mark 2B Nylon Tip Drumsticks

Bands
Current
 Dark Angel (1984-1992, 2002-2005, 2013-present)
 DTA: Death to All (2012-present)
 Pitch Black Forecast (2005-present)
 Tenet (1996-present)

Former
 Death (1993-1995)
 Fear Factory (2009-2012)
 Forbidden (2011)
 Meldrum (2008-2009)
 Phantasm (1987)
 Strapping Young Lad (1995-2007)
 Viking (2011-2013)
 Zimmers Hole (2007-2018)
 Testament (1997-1998, 2011-2022)
 Dethklok (2007–2021)
Live
 Anthrax (2012, 2018)
 Forbidden (2011)
 Opeth (2004)
 Unearth (2007)

Session
 Old Man's Child (1998)
 The Almighty Punchdrunk (1999)
 Daemon (2002)
Devin Townsend (1998-2001)
 Frygirl (2001)
 Just Cause (2001)
 Naphobia (1995)
 Wargod (1985)

Timeline

Discography
Hoglan played drums on the following albums, unless otherwise noted.
 1983: Slayer – Show No Mercy (backing vocals on "Evil Has No Boundaries")
 1985: Wargod – Wargod  (demo)
 1986: Dark Angel – Darkness Descends
 1987: Phantasm – Wreckage (demo)
 1989: Dark Angel – Leave Scars 1990: Dark Angel – Live Scars (EP)
 1991: Dark Angel – Time Does Not Heal 1992: Dark Angel – Decade of Chaos 1992: Silent Scream – From the Darkest Depths of the Imagination (mixing and production)
 1993: Death – Individual Thought Patterns 1995: Death – Symbolic 1995: Naphobia – Of Hell (guest drummer)
 1997: Strapping Young Lad – City 1997: Testament – Demonic 1998: Old Man's Child – Ill–Natured Spiritual Invasion 1998: Strapping Young Lad – No Sleep Till Bedtime 1998: Devin Townsend – Infinity 1998: Devin Townsend – Christeen Plus 4 Demos (EP)
 1999: The Almighty Punchdrunk – Music for Them Asses 2000: Devin Townsend – Physicist 2001: Devin Townsend – Terria 2001: Just Cause – Finger It Out 2001: Frygirl – Someone Please Kill Me (Congas)
 2002: Daemon – Eye for an Eye 2003: Strapping Young Lad – Strapping Young Lad 2003: Tenet – Sovereign (demo)
 2005: Strapping Young Lad – Alien 2005: Opeth – played drums in the video for "The Grand Conjuration" from their Ghost Reveries album
 2005: Ani Kyd – Evil Needs Candy Too 2006: Strapping Young Lad – The New Black 2007: Meldrum – Blowin' Up the Machine (guest drummer)
 2007: Dethklok – The Dethalbum 2007: Dethklok – ...And You Will Know Us by the Trail of Dead/Dethklok 2007: Mr. Plow – Apocalypse Plow 2008: Zimmers Hole – When You Were Shouting at the Devil...We Were in League With Satan 2008: Pitch Black Forecast – Absentee 2008: Mechanism – Inspired Horrific 2009: Fattooth – Fattooth 2009: Dethklok – Dethalbum II 2009: Tenet – Sovereign 2010: Fear Factory – Mechanize 2012: Brendon Small – Brendon Small's Galaktikon 2012: Testament – Dark Roots of Earth 2012: Pitch Black Forecast – Burning in Water... Drowning in Flame 2012: Meldrum – Lifer 2012: Dethklok – Dethalbum III 2012: Sylencer – A Lethal Dose of Truth (guest drummer on "Get It Up")
 2012: Memorain – Evolution 2013: Dethklok – The Doomstar Requiem 2014: Pitch Black Forecast – As the World Burns 2015: Viking – No Child Left Behind 2016: Testament – Brotherhood of the Snake 2017: Brendon Small – Brendon Small's Galaktikon II 2019: Bear McCreary – Godzilla: King of the Monsters (soundtrack)
 2019: Bryan Beller – Scenes from the Flood 2020: Testament – Titans of CreationVideography

 Dark Angel - Ultimate Revenge 2 (VHS, 1989)
 Strapping Young Lad - For Those Aboot to Rock: Live at the Commodore (DVD, 2004, Century Media Records)
 Gene Hoglan - The Atomic Clock (DVD, 2010, Hoglan Industries)
 Behind the Player: Dimmu Borgir (DVD, 2010, Alfred Music Publishing)
 Gene Hoglan - The Clock Strikes Two'' (DVD, 2016, Hoglan Industries)
 Bryan Beller - "Mastering Tone and Versatility (DVD, 2012, Alfred Music Publishing)

References

External links

 

American heavy metal drummers
American black metal musicians
1967 births
Living people
Dark Angel (band) members
Death (metal band) members
Testament (band) members
Millikan High School alumni
Musicians from Dallas
Musicians from Long Beach, California
Forbidden (band) members
20th-century American drummers
American male drummers
Fear Factory members
Strapping Young Lad members
Old Man's Child members
Phantasm (band) members
Dethklok members